Honda is a town and municipality in the Tolima department of Colombia. The population of the municipality was 23,616 as of the census 2018. Along with Líbano, Honda is the seat of the Roman Catholic Diocese of Líbano-Honda. The main industries of Honda are tourism, fishing, and cattle-ranching.

Toponymy (name origin)

Honda takes its name from the Ondaimas, the indigenous people that inhabited the banks of the Magdalena river and the region where the city lies today.

Honda is called "the City of Bridges" with more than 40 of them on the rivers Magdalena, Gualí, Guarinó, and Quebrada Seca. It is also called the "City of Peace" as it escaped most of the violence of the 1950s.

History

Honda was founded on August 24, 1539 by Francisco Nuñez Pedroso. The "golden age" of the city was between 1850 and 1910 when the Magdalena river constituted the only means of transportation between the Caribbean coast and the inland city of Bogotá. The city was the main river port of the country and all the imported goods and articles arrived in Bogotá through the port of Honda.

Because of its historical importance, Honda was named a Pueblo Patrimonio (heritage town) of Colombia in 2010. As of March 2021, it is the only municipality in the Middle Magdalena Valley region that has been awarded this distinction.

References

Populated places on the Magdalena River
Port cities in Colombia
Municipalities of Tolima Department